Rogers Lee Brown (born May 24, 1954), is a former Major League Baseball player who played outfield in the major leagues from -. Brown played for the Toronto Blue Jays (1979), New York Yankees (1979-), Seattle Mariners and San Diego Padres (-1985)

In 502 games, Brown accumulated 110 stolen bases, 313 hits, 26 home runs, 130 RBI, and a .245 batting average.

He and Jay Johnstone were sent from the Phillies to the Yankees for Rawly Eastwick on the day before the trade deadline on June 14, 1978.

His best season came in 1980 with the Yankees, when he hit 14 home runs, with 47 runs batted in and 27 stolen bases. He also played in two World Series during his career (1981 for the Yankees, and 1984 for the Padres).

References

External links
, or Retrosheet, or Pura Pelota (Venezuelan Winter League)

1954 births
Living people
African-American baseball players
American expatriate baseball players in Canada
Águilas del Zulia players
Asheville Orioles players
Baseball players from Norfolk, Virginia
Bluefield Orioles players
Columbus Clippers players
International League MVP award winners
Las Vegas Stars (baseball) players
Lodi Orioles players
Major League Baseball outfielders
Miami Orioles players
New York Yankees players
Oklahoma City 89ers players
Peninsula Pilots players
Puerto Rico Boricuas players
Reading Phillies players
Salt Lake City Gulls players
San Diego Padres players
Seattle Mariners players
Tacoma Yankees players
Tiburones de La Guaira players
American expatriate baseball players in Venezuela
Toronto Blue Jays players
21st-century African-American people
20th-century African-American sportspeople